Proesstraat (Proes Street) is an Afrikaans Television-Show which airs on kykNet based on the German improvisational comedy show Schillerstrasse. It is recorded without a script, in front of a live audience and broadcast unedited to a large extent.

Idea and show structure
The setting of the show is the living room of the main actor Waldemar Schultz who lives on the real street "Proesstraat" in Pretoria, South Africa. The main character is regularly visited by friends and relatives. The participants only know the topic of the episode in advance. The whole plot has to be improvised comically. The cast receive directions from the Regisseur (Director/Presenter) on their ear-pieces, and have to follow the cues, e.g. "Eloise: Tell the others you're pregnant!".

The show mostly airs unedited and things that go wrong are not removed, either.

The original German show was created by Maike Tatzig who is also the show's executive producer. Debuting on Germany's Sat.1, ”Schiller Street” (created and produced by Hurricane) has been one of the most innovative and successful comedy formats in the recent years. The concept has already won various national and international TV prizes such as the Rose d’Or Press Prize 2005. SevenOne International, the ProSiebenSat.1 Group's worldwide programming sales company has sold the format to numerous countries, including France, Italy, Russia, Finland, Norway and Turkey. The Italian adaptation “Buona la Prima” won the national “Telegrolle 2008” and “Gran Premio della Fiction Italiana '08” for best sitcom.

Main cast
The main cast include Waldemar Schultz, Pierre Breytenbach, Melt Sieberhagen, Wikus du Toit, Eloise Cupido, Esther von Waltsleben and Martelize Kolver.
Eloise Cupido did not return on the 2nd season.
 Waldemar Schultz, Esther von Waltsleben and Martelize Kolver did not return for the 3rd season. New cast members for the third season included Pierre van Heerden, Ilne Fourie, Desire Gardner, Mortimer Williams and Cindy Swanepoel.

Celebrity Guests
They interchange with dozens of other guests and Afrikaans celebrities including June van Mersh, Emo Adams, Tammy-Ann Fortuin, Sean Else, Wicus van der Merwe, Joey Rasdien, Elize Cawood, Tobie Cronje, Karen Wessels, Dowwe Dolla, Marion Holm, Neels van Jaarsveld, Casper de Vries, Shaleen Surtie-Richards and Pedro Kruger. 
Guests for season 2 included Hannes Muller, Hannah Grobler, Hannon Bothma, Steve Hofmeyr, Louw Venter, Jannie Moolman, Gigi Strydom and Snotkop.
Guests for season 3 included Ben Kruger, Hannon Bothma, Sylvaine Strike and Toks van der Linde.
Guests for season 4 included Neels van Jaarsveld, Snotkop, Heinz Winckler, Riaan Cruywagen, Anrich Herbst and Gys de Villiers.

Production
Production on Season 1 started on 7 January 2010 and all 26 episodes were completed by 23 January 2010, shot in front of a live audience at University of Johannesburg's theatre.
Production on Season 2 started on 2 December 2010 and by 22 December 2010 30 new episodes were shot in front of a live audience at University of Johannesburg's theater. kykNet announced that all tickets to attend the filming of Season 2 were available from Computicket.
Production on Season 3 started on 6 January 2013 and all 26 episodes were completed by 2 February 2013, shot in front of a live audience at University of Johannesburg's theatre.
Production on Season 4 started on 30 Oktober 2014 and all 26 episodes were completed by 15 November 2014, shot in front of a live audience at University of Johannesburg's theatre.

Awards
Proesstraat was nominated for 2 Golden Horn (South African Film and Television Awards) or SAFTAS for Season 1 in the categories Best Ensemble Cast in a Comedy as well as a nomination for Wikus du Toit as Best Actor in a Comedy. The production won the SAFTA for Best Comedy - Ensemble Cast in 2011 for Season 1.
Season 2 received 3 SAFTA nomination and won 2 awards; Best Comedy Writing Team and Best Director for Harald Richter.

Season 1 (a) Episodes

Season 1 (b) Episodes

Season 2 (a) episodes

Season 3 episodes

Season 4 episodes

Transmission
On 29 April 2010 kykNet announced that all 26 episodes of Proesstraat will not be aired continuously. The channel decided to air the first 15 episodes, take a break of 3 months and re-commence with the final 11 episodes on 7 August 2010. The first season of Proesstraat was extremely favorably received by critics and one newspaper reviewer called it “...deliciously funny.”
The final episode of Season 2 was aired on 26 September 2011.

References

External links
Proestraat Fanpage
  Facebook Page for Proesstraat
 KykNet Homepage
 Trailer for Ep. 1
  Trailer for Ep.2
 Fanpage for Wikus du Toit

South African comedy television series
Afrikaans-language television shows
Television shows set in South Africa